Moscow Saga  is a Russian television series loosely based on the eponymous trilogy Vasily Aksyonov. The shooting took place in the winter and spring of 2004. It aired from 11 October to 12 November 2004 on Channel One Russia.

Plot
Moscow Saga shows the fate of family of medicine professor Boris Nikitich Gradov from the mid-1920s to mid-1950s against the background of the history of the new Soviet state. Boris' character represents the old dynasty of Russian doctors. His sons and daughter did not continue in his footsteps, but instead chose other professions. The eldest son, Nikita, joined the military; the younger, Kirill, became a Marxist theoretician; and Boris' daughter Nina became a writer.

Cast

Yuri Solomin as Boris Nikitich Gradov
Inna Churikova as Mary Gradova
Alexander Baluev as Nikita Gradov
Ekaterina Nikitina as Veronica Gradova
 Alexey Zuev as Kirill Gradov
Olga Budina as Nina Gradova
Alexey Kortnev as Vadim Vuinovich
Kristina Orbakaite as Vera Gorda (prototype — singer Nina Dorda)
Dmitry Kharatyan as Shevchuk (guard in the Gulag)
Marianna Schultz as Celia Rosenblum
 Victoria Tolstoganova as Tasia Pyzhykova 
 Andrei Smirnov as Leonid Pulkovo
Sergei Bezrukov as Vasily Stalin
Marina Yakovleva as Agasha
Alexander Rezalin as Nugzar
Igor Bochkin as Petukhov
Ilya Noskov as Boris Gradov IV
Dmitry Ulyanov as Semyon Stroilo
 Elena Kasyanova as Mayka Strepetova
Irina Kupchenko as Mayka's mother
Marina Shvydkaya as Elizaveta
 Andrey Ilin as  Savva Kitaygorodsky
Valery Ivakov as Vaskov
 Vladimir Mironov as Joseph Stalin
 Igor Sklyar as Mikhail Frunze
 Pavel Remezov as Molotov
 Alexei Makarov as Alexander Sheremetyev
Vitaly Egorov as Sandro Pevzner
Anna Snatkina as Yolka Kitaygorodskaya
Vladimir Dolinsky as Shaytis
 Irina Brazgovka as Leonid Pulkovo's beloved 
 Mikhail Yefremov as party organizer of the medical institute
 Tatiana Samoilova as Professor
Vyacheslav Shalevich as General
Regimantas Adomaitis as journalist Reston
 Emilyano Ochagaviya as  Galaktion Gudiashvili
 Nana Mchedlidze as Keke, Stalin's mother
 Alexey Bysh as Obersturmbannfuehrer

References

External links
 
 И дольше саги длился фильм

Russian-language television shows
Films shot in Moscow
2004 Russian television series debuts
2004 Russian television series endings
2000s Russian television series
Films based on Russian novels
Channel One Russia original programming
Russian drama television series
Russian television miniseries
Television shows set in Russia
Television shows set in Moscow